Go-to-market, go-to-market strategy or GTM strategy  is the plan of an organization, utilizing their outside resources (e.g. sales force and distributors), to deliver their unique value proposition to customers and achieve competitive advantage.

The end goal is to enhance the overall customer experience by offering a superior product and/or more competitive pricing.

Developing a go-to-market strategy 

In the earliest stages of developing a go-to-market strategy for a new product or a service, the company has to initially conduct an accurate definition of the target market. The company has to decide whether they already have prospective customers within their customer base but using different services.

After defining the market, the product or service is researched until a final decision has been made on what the value proposition will be. Then the company determines its pricing strategy. It is very challenging to decide what pricing strategy to follow as it differs from one product or service to another, or even when the product or service remains the same but the strategy changes, such as switching to subscription-based pricing (an example for this is Adobe's major shift from selling its Creative Suite software which included all Adobe's products such as Photoshop and Illustrator, to a $50-per-month Creative Cloud and various other subscription plans).

Moreover, choosing the right distribution and marketing channels followed by promotion are very vital steps in a go-to-market strategy. A company has to decide which distribution model to choose, what kind of support and services are required and addressing the possibility of creating a competitive advantage. Afterwards, the company decides how it is going to promote its product or services and what kind of marketing campaigns are the most influential to follow.

Driving factors in a go-to-market strategy 
When considering to develop a go-to-market strategy, there are 3 essential factors to focus on:

Customers 
Delivering exceptional customer experiences leads to loyalty and advocacy of the customer. Consequently, that triggers increase in product purchase, customer retention and low cost of service.

These are people that may or may not even know you exist, that you'd like to do business with. You have to figure out from a marketing standpoint, how to attract these people and get them to engage with your brand in some way such as visiting your website, attending a webinar, responding to an email and more.

MQL
The first conversion point is MQL which is a marketing qualified lead. This is a human being that has in some way expressed interest in engaging with you, it doesn't mean they're ready to buy but it means they are willing to engage. It could be a Contact Us form, it could be a demo request, it could be they just want to learn more, these can all be considered marketing qualified leads. The MQL is a qualification metric for the performance of your marketing.

If this rate grows over time, it means you are doing a better job at targeting your customer base, and a better job of converting them to be interested to engage. If you have 1000 people on your email list, and every month 10-30 of them become leads, you now can measure how good you are at engaging them via email.

Company  
Taking company's mission and vision into account is a key determining factor when performing a go-to-market strategy. Motivating employees to perform well is a decisive factor to include. Thus, defining company's vision and what kind of impact it is trying to create is essential in the earliest stages of a go-to-market strategy.

Competition 
Understanding the competition is crucial in deciding what product or service to offer. Gathering information about how competitors are performing in the market, what customers think of the different products available and what is missing in the market through conducting research using different methods such as SWOT and PEST analyses.

Market segmentation in a go-to-market strategy 
Market segmentation is the process by which one divides prospective customers into different groups (segments) that have common needs and the same expected reaction to a marketing action. This approach enables companies to offer customers full value proposition of their products or services.

There are common factors considered when performing a market segmentation in a go-to-market strategy:
 Industry: The industry in which the customer is involved.
 Customer size and sales potential of the customer.
 Customer behavior: Studying the customer's behavior related to the product or service such as the customer buying from a competitor or examining the responsiveness to selling effort.
 Geography: Geographical locations of prospective buyers.
 Application and use of the product or service by the customer.
 Benefits earned by the customer due to buying the product or service.
 Information which is required to be provided by the company to the customer.
 Usage situation: When and where the product or service is used.
 Profitability of selling to a certain customer.

Go-to-market strategy and marketing strategy 
Marketing strategy includes every marketing activity which helps an organization to target the market after conducting market research.

Go-to-market strategy usually develops during the introduction of new products or services. Marketing strategy covers:

 the products or services of a business
 market share and position of those products and services
 identification of clients and competitors
 basics of a marketing plan

Example of a go-to-market strategy 
An example of using a go-to-market strategy could be observed in the automobile insurance industry. Initially, the company has to choose the right segment of the market (market segmentation). If the customers are considered individual households, then the company works on creating interest in their prospective customers using different forms of media such as TV advertisements, social media, and billboards. Once the customers are persuaded to proceed, they are offered to purchase the service through different channels such as the internet (company's website) or agents, both of which act as entities responsible for customer service.

In the case of customers being corporate accounts during the market segmentation process, interest creation and purchase are done through direct sales, agents, or the internet. Tele-service and direct-service representatives serve as contacts after the purchase.

See also 
 Marketing
 Market segmentation
 Marketing plan
 Marketing strategy

References

Product lifecycle management
Strategic management